Starveillance is a claymation television series created by Celebrity Deathmatch creator Eric Fogel that debuted on January 5, 2007, on E!. The show is produced by Toronto-based Cuppa Coffee Studios. Fogel chose not to work on his revived MTV hit Celebrity Deathmatch in order to spend more time working on this show. The series became available on Peacock.

Show
The show parodies celebrity situations through stop-motion animation. 
The show is hosted by Glen and Corey, who hide video cameras all over the world to tape celebrities in their private moments.

Episodes

Response
The response from critics was mostly positive. For example, Variety said:

"Starveillance isn't the kind of concept likely to have significant staying power, but it feels like a logical step for E! as the channel seeks to branch out beyond its limited reality-TV profile into somewhat more ambitious fare -- the kind of show whose best moments are tailor-made to be sliced, diced and repurposed on YouTube." - Brian Lowry, Variety.

Syndication and Broadcast
Teen channel The N aired the episodes from April 11, 2009, to May 16, 2009. In addition to airing in the United States, the series aired in Italy under the title Starveglianza on E! in the same year.

Awards
In 2008, the series was nominated an Elan Award for Best Animated Production.

References

External links

Starveillance MySpace

2000s American adult animated television series
2000s American parody television series
2007 American television series debuts
2007 American television series endings
2000s Canadian adult animated television series
2007 Canadian television series debuts
2007 Canadian television series endings
American adult animated comedy television series
Canadian adult animated comedy television series
American stop-motion adult animated television series
Canadian stop-motion adult animated television series
Canadian parody television series
Crossover animated television series
English-language television shows
E! original programming
Television series by Cuppa Coffee Studios
Television series created by Eric Fogel